Bryan Baguley (born 25 March 1971) is a South African cricketer. He played in sixteen first-class and eight List A matches for Boland and Western Province from 1991/92 to 1997/98.

See also
 List of Boland representative cricketers

References

External links
 

1971 births
Living people
South African cricketers
Boland cricketers
Western Province cricketers
Cricketers from Cape Town